The Musée Moissan is a museum dedicated to Henri Moissan (1852–1907), winner of the 1906 Nobel Prize in Chemistry. It is maintained by the Université René Descartes-Paris 5 faculty of pharmaceutical and biological sciences, and located in the 6th arrondissement of Paris at 4, avenue de l'Observatoire, Paris, France. It is open by appointment only; admission is free.

See also 
 List of museums in Paris

References

External links 
 "Historique du Musée Moissan", Jean Flahaut, Revue d'histoire de la pharmacie, 2007, Volume 94, Issue 356. pp. 537–539. 
 ParisInfo description
 Culture.fr article (French)
 Map of museums in the VIe arrondissement

Museums in Paris
University of Paris
Science museums in France
Moissan
Buildings and structures in the 6th arrondissement of Paris